Karl Harris (21 October 1979 – 3 June 2014) was a three-time British Supersport champion. In 2010 he switched to the British Superstock Championship on a GR Motorsport Aprilia. Harris was killed when racing during the 2014 Isle of Man TT.

Early career
Harris started his career in 1996, moving through the junior ranks to race in the European Superstock Championship, winning the title on the Suzuki GSX-R750, as well as taking in some rounds of World Supersport in 1999, with a best result of 4th. He returned to the UK in 2001, racing a Suzuki in the British Supersport Championship, which he won. He then graduated to Superbike racing in 2002 on a Suzuki, but this was not a successful season. In 2003 and 2004, he again raced in Supersport for HM Plant Honda, winning the title in both years.

British Superbikes 2005-2014
For 2005 Harris returned to BSB with a Honda run from their UK factory in Swindon, finishing 9th overall with a best result of 3rd.

He moved to the main HRC Honda team alongside Ryuichi Kiyonari for 2006, taking a 2nd place at Oulton Park, less than 0.1 seconds behind race winner Gregorio Lavilla. A crash in the first race at Snetterton caused him to miss the second, although he was not seriously injured. He took his first pole position at Oulton Park that year. He came close to his first series win in the second race at Croft in the wet, passed by Leon Haslam with half a lap to go. While Kiyonari won the title, Harris finished fifth overall, behind the semi-works bike of Jonathan Rea, who replaced him in the factory team for 2007.

He switched to the Hydrex Honda for 2007, with a best result in the first half of the season a 6th place, again showing good pace at Oulton Park. He scored an emotional second place in the second round at Oulton Park in August.

For 2008 he moved to Rob Mac Racing, riding a factory Yamaha. He crashed in the first round after being struck by Tom Sykes' fallen Rizla Suzuki. He did not finish any of the first six races of the year, leading him to largely give up on the season. At the final meeting of the season he was quick in practice, before being forced to pull out. He made a one-off appearance on a works Yamaha in the World Supersport championship at Brands Hatch, crashing out of 5th place.

For 2009 Harris moved to Shaun Muir's Hydrex Bike Devil's Honda team. He was tipped as a dark horse for the title by former rival Leon Haslam, but struggled to meet expectations. Following two second-place finishes in round two of the championship at Oulton Park, Harris struggled to compete with the championship contenders throughout the season. On 4 September 2009, with three rounds of the championship remaining, his contract with the Hydrex Honda team was terminated with immediate effect. having been on a race-by-race deal for much of the season due to Muir being unhappy with his performance He contested the final two rounds on a Sorrymate.com SMT Honda, but crashed heavily in the final meeting at Oulton Park.

For 2010 he switched to the British Superstock Championship on a GR Motorsport Aprilia, but left the team after three disappointing races.

2012 Harris took the place of Gary Mason in the PR Racing under the banner of Quattro Plant Kawasaki. He raced in a few selected rounds and had some promising finishes including finishing 7th and 9th at Cadwell Park. These results were some of the team's best finishes all season. Karl then continued with PR Racing for the rest of the season racing at Assen(18th), Silverstone(13th) and Brands Hatch(12th).

In 2013 Harris signed a new contract with PR Racing and started his first BSB season since 2009 when he was racing with Hydrex Honda.

Death
Harris died on 3 June 2014 after an incident at Joey's Corner on the second lap of the Superstock Race during the 2014 Isle of Man TT.

Career results

In 2012 Harris made his TT debut for the SMT Honda racing team finishing 21st in the superbike race and 28th in the superstock race whilst also lapping in excess of 121 mph.

References

1979 births
2014 deaths
British Supersport Championship riders
British Superbike Championship riders
English motorcycle racers
FIM Superstock 1000 Cup riders
Motorcycle racers who died while racing
Sport deaths in the Isle of Man
Sportspeople from Sheffield
Supersport World Championship riders